Earth is a 2007 nature documentary film which depicts the diversity of wild habitats and creatures across the planet. The film begins in the Arctic in January of one year and moves southward, concluding in Antarctica in the December of the same year. Along the way, it features the journeys made by three particular species—the polar bear, African bush elephant and humpback whale—to highlight the threats to their survival in the face of rapid environmental change. A companion piece to the 2006 BBC/Discovery television series Planet Earth, the film uses many of the same sequences, though most are edited differently, and features previously unseen footage.

Earth was directed by Alastair Fothergill, the executive producer of the television series, and Mark Linfield, the producer of Planet Earths "From Pole to Pole" and "Seasonal Forests" episodes. It was co-produced by BBC Natural History Unit and Greenlight Media, with Discovery providing some of the funding. In North America, the film was released by Disneynature, and was one of the first films under Disney's recently formed nature film label. The same organisations collaborated on Fothergill's previous film, Deep Blue (2003), itself a companion to his 2001 television series on the natural history of the world's oceans, The Blue Planet. The British version of Earth was narrated by Patrick Stewart and the US version was narrated by James Earl Jones.

Earth was released in cinemas internationally during the final quarter of 2007 and throughout 2008. With total worldwide box office revenue exceeding $100 million, Earth is the second-highest-grossing nature documentary of all time.

A sequel, titled Earth: One Amazing Day, was released in the United States on 6 October 2017. It made its world premiere in Beijing.

Plot
Over the course of a calendar year, Earth takes the viewer on a journey from the North Pole in January to the South in December, revealing how plants and animals respond to the power of the sun and the changing seasons. The film focuses on three particular species, the polar bear, African bush elephant and humpback whale.

Starting in the high Arctic in January, as the darkness of winter gives way to the sun, a mother polar bear is shown emerging from her den with two new cubs. She needs food and must lead her cubs to her hunting ground on the sea ice before it begins to break up. By April, the sun never sets, and by August all the sea ice has melted. The mother and cubs have retreated to dry land, but a male polar bear is trapped at sea and must seek out land by swimming. He reaches an island with a walrus colony but is too exhausted to make a successful kill. He dies from injuries sustained in a walrus attack.

African bush elephants are filmed from the air as they negotiate a dust storm in the Kalahari Desert. June is the dry season and they must follow ancient paths passed down through generations to reach watering holes. A mother and calf are separated from the herd in the storm but manage to reach shelter. The matriarch leads the herd to a temporary watering hole, but they must share it with hungry lions and scavenger white-backed vultures. The lions are shown attacking a solitary elephant at night, when their superior vision gives them the upper hand. The herd times its arrival at the Okavango Delta to coincide with seasonal floodwaters which transform the desert into a lush water world.

A humpback whale mother and calf are filmed from the air and underwater at their breeding grounds in the shallow seas of the tropics. There is nothing here for the mother to eat, so she must guide her calf on a  journey south to the rich feeding grounds near Antarctica, the longest migration of any marine mammal. En route, they navigate dangerous seas where great white sharks are filmed breaching as they hunt. Sea lions, and sailfish and dolphins combine to bait a shoal of small fish. By October they enter polar waters, and by December the Antarctic sun has melted the sea ice to form sheltered bays. Here, the whales are shown feeding on krill by trapping them in bubble nets.

The stories of these individual creatures are woven into the film alongside a great many additional scenes. The supporting cast of animals include mandarin ducklings filmed jumping from their tree hole nest, Arctic wolves hunting caribou, cheetah hunting Thomson's gazelle, elephants charging at white-backed vulture, birds of paradise displaying in the New Guinea rainforest, Adelie penguins in the Antarctic and demoiselle cranes on their autumn migration across the Himalayas.

Themes
The narration is woven around the theme of anthropogenic environmental change. The three species it features are used to illustrate particular threats to the planet's wildlife. In the Arctic, rising temperatures are causing a greater area of sea ice to melt and threatening the polar bear with extinction as early as 2030. Global warming is also disrupting the planet's weather systems and making seasonal rainfall patterns less predictable. This poses a threat to creatures like elephants, which must travel greater distances to reach water. Rising ocean temperatures have started to kill the plankton on which humpback whales and most other sea life depend. The film ends with the message that "it's not too late to make a difference."

Production
Earth was produced by Alix Tidmarsh of BBC Worldwide and Sophokles Tasioulis of Greenlight Media. Following Deep Blue, it is the second film of a five-picture deal between the two companies. The process of bringing Planet Earth and Earth to the screen took over five years. With a budget of $47 million, the film was the most expensive production in the history of documentary filmmaking at the time, later to be surpassed by Oceans. Principal photography began in 2004 and was completed in 2006.

Release
The movie's tentative title was titled Planet Earth, the same as the TV series. In February 2005, BBC Worldwide pre-sold distribution rights to the movie to Gaumont in France, Wanda Vision in Spain, and Frenetic Films in Switzerland.

On February 13, 2007, it was announced that Lionsgate had acquired US, UK and Australian distribution rights to the movie. Outside of those territories, additional companies who acquired the movie included Universum Film in Germany, GAGA Corporation in Japan, and Audio Visual Enterprises/Prooptiki in Greece. After this initial acquirements, Earth received its world premiere at Spain's San Sebastián International Film Festival in September 2007. It was released across Europe in the fourth quarter of 2007 and early 2008 to much success.

For unknown reasons, Lionsgate never released the movie in the US as originally intended, and in April 2008, it was announced that the North American distribution rights to Earth was acquired by Walt Disney Studios. Disney announced that the movie would be released under their then-new Disneynature film unit, which would specialise in natural history documentaries for the first time since True-Life Adventures. The film was released in the US on 22 April 2009, with James Earl Jones narrating in place of Patrick Stewart. Walt Disney Studios Motion Pictures also acquired distribution of the movie in Canada and Latin American countries as well.

Regional differences
In addition to replacing Patrick Stewart with James Earl Jones as a narrator, the U.S. version uses a more dramatic soundtrack and runs only 90 minutes, compared to the original cut's 99 minutes.

Reception

Critical response
Rotten Tomatoes reported that 87% of critics gave the film positive reviews based on 91 reviews, the second-highest score of all the Disneynature films (behind Monkey Kingdom, which has a score of 93%), with an average score of 7.2 out of 10. Its consensus stated: "With its spectacular and extensive footage, Earth is both informative and entertaining." Another review aggregator, Metacritic, which assigns a normalised rating out of 100 top reviews from mainstream critics, gave an average score of 72, being a generally favourable review, based on 26 reviews.

Box office
On its first day of release in the US, Earth opened at #1, grossing $4,023,788 from 1,810 theaters. For its first weekend, it opened at #5, grossing $8,825,760, as well as $14,472,792 over the five-day period. Despite dropping to #7 the next weekend, taking in $4,340,235, it took in $12,017,017 over the previous week (including Sunday), and ending up with a two-week total of $22,004,284. It closed on July 30, 2009 after 100 days of release, ending up with a final gross of $32,011,576, making it a modest success in the US.

Earth picked up an additional $76,931,115 at the international box office. It took over $30 million in Germany alone, became one of the three highest-grossing films of the year in France and had the best opening of any natural history documentary in Spain. By contrast, in the UK Earth debuted on just 14 screens and amassed less than £75,000 in ticket sales.

In January 2008, the Japanese version of Earth, narrated by actor Ken Watanabe, knocked Hollywood blockbuster I Am Legend off the top of the box office despite opening on half the number of screens. It went on to gross more than 2 billion yen ($18.5 million), making it the most successful documentary there of the last 10 years.

Its worldwide total of $108,942,691 made Earth a commercial success and placed it second on the all-time list of highest-grossing nature documentaries, behind March of the Penguins.

Sequel
On 6 October 2017, a sequel, Earth: One Amazing Day was released. The film was narrated by Robert Redford.

Further reading
 Nature filmmaking: Ready for their close-up from The Independent
 Screen giants of Earth, the year's biggest film from The Daily Telegraph
 Earth press book from the Greenlight Media website

References

External links
  at Disney.com
 
 

2007 films
2007 in the environment
2007 documentary films
American documentary films
British documentary films
BBC Film films
Lionsgate films
Disneynature films
Discovery Channel original programming
Documentary films about mammals
Documentary films about nature
English-language German films
Films scored by George Fenton
Films about elephants
Films about polar bears
Films about whales
Films directed by Alastair Fothergill
Films directed by Mark Linfield
Documentary films about Antarctica
Documentary films about Africa
Documentary films about the Arctic
Documentary films about Asia
Films set in Botswana
Documentary films about Oceania
German documentary films
British independent films
German independent films
Planet Earth (franchise)
2000s English-language films
2000s American films
2000s British films
2000s German films